Princess (stylized as Prince$$) is a Canadian television series hosted by Gail Vaz-Oxlade that premiered in 2010, and ran original programming until 2012 (three seasons). The program is similar in format to her earlier endeavor, Til Debt Do Us Part; however, rather than helping couples in financial trouble, Vaz-Oxlade assists women who are considered self-indulgent and spoiled. Participants are given weekly challenges, some of which are to help bring the finances and debt under control, while others are meant to help correct the participant's attitude and make amends to their friends and relatives. At the end of six weeks, Vaz-Oxlade gives the participant a cheque for an amount up to $5,000, based upon Vaz-Oxlade's assessment of the participant's success in each of the challenges.

In the United States, the show airs on the cable channel Ion Life.

Episodes
Season 2:

See also
 Til Debt Do Us Part

References

External links
 Princess show description at Slice TV website

Slice (TV channel) original programming
2010s Canadian reality television series
2010 Canadian television series debuts
Personal finance education
Television series by Corus Entertainment
2012 Canadian television series endings